Kazi Sharmin Nahid Nupur (born 17 December 1977), known by her stage name Shabnur, is a Bangladeshi film actress. She won Bangladesh National Film Award for Best Actress for her role in the film Dui Noyoner Alo (2005).

Background
Kazi Sharmin Nahid Nupur was born on 17 December 1979 at Nabharan, Jessore, Bangladesh. Her father is Shahjahan Chowdhury. She has a sister and a brother–Jhumur and Tamal.

Career
Shabnur debuted her career with co-actor Shabbir in the 1993 film Chandni Raatey, directed by Ehtesham. She got her breakthrough in her second film Tumi Amar, co-acted with Salman Shah in 1994.

Shabnur co-acted with Salman until his death in 1996. She later acted with Omar Sunny, Riaz, Ferdous Ahmed, and Shakib Khan, among others.

After a year-long break, two films, Bhalobasha Saint Martin-e and Attogopon, of Shabnur were releasedin 2012. In 2013, she acted in Kichhu Asha Kicchu Bhalobasha.

Personal life
Shabnur got engaged with Anik Mahmud, a businessman, on 6 December 2011 and married on 28 December 2012. The couple officially got divorced on 26 January 2020 due to compatibility issues. Together they have a son, Aijan Nehan, who was born on December 29, 2013.

Shabnur established a school, Sydney International School, in Baridhara, Dhaka  in 2011. She resides in Sydney, Australia. She has Australian citizenship since 2012.

Awards

In 2004 Shabnur won the  Bachsas Award for best actress in the film .

She won the Bangladesh National Film Award for Best Actress in 2006 for her role in the film Dui Noyoner Alo (2005), and won Meril Prothom Alo Awards for best actress ten times.

In 2011 she received the CJFB Performance Award for Best Actress in the 2010 film Ebhabei Bhalobasha Hoy.

Filmography

References

External links
 
 
 

1979 births
Living people
Bangladeshi film actresses
Best Actress National Film Awards (Bangladesh) winners
Best Film Actress Meril-Prothom Alo Award winners
Best Actress Bachsas Award winners